Jonas Mekas (December 24, 1922 – January 23, 2019) was a Lithuanian-American filmmaker, poet, and artist who has been called "the godfather of American avant-garde cinema". Mekas' work has been exhibited in museums and at festivals worldwide.

Mekas was active in New York City, where he co-founded Anthology Film Archives, The Film-Makers’ Cooperative, and the journal Film Culture. He was also the first film critic for The Village Voice.

In the 1960s, Mekas launched anti-censorship campaigns in defense of the LGBTQ-themed films of Jean Genet and Jack Smith, garnering support from cultural figures including Jean-Paul Sartre, Simone de Beauvoir, Norman Mailer, Susan Sontag.

Mekas mentored and supported many prominent American artists and filmmakers, including Ken Jacobs, Peter Bogdanovich, Chantal Akerman, Richard Foreman, John Waters, Barbara Rubin, Yoko Ono, and Martin Scorsese. He helped launch the writing careers of the critics Andrew Sarris, Amy Taubin, and J. Hoberman.

Historian Michael Casper has written about Mekas's work editing two far-right, collaborationist newspapers under the Nazi occupation of Lithuania during World War II.

Early life
Mekas was born in Semeniškiai, the son of Elzbieta (Jašinskaitė) and Povilas Mekas on December 24, 1922. As a teenager, he attended the Biržai Gymnasium in Biržai, Lithuania. From 1941 to 1942, living under Nazi occupation, he edited, and published in, Naujosios Biržų žinios, founded by the far-right, anti-semitic Lithuanian Activist Front. From 1943 to 1944, he edited, and published in, Panevėžio apygardos balsas, a weekly local newspaper published by the fascist .

In 1944, Mekas left Lithuania with his brother, Adolfas Mekas. They attempted to reach neutral Switzerland by means of Vienna, with fabricated student papers arranged by their uncle. Their train was stopped in Germany, and they were both imprisoned in a labor camp in Elmshorn, a suburb of Hamburg, for eight months. The brothers escaped and hid on a farm near the Danish border for two months until the end of the war. After the war, Mekas lived in displaced persons' camps in Wiesbaden and Kassel. From 1946 to 1948, he studied philosophy at the University of Mainz. By the end of 1949 his brother and he had both secured sponsorship through a job in Chicago and emigrated to the United States. When they arrived, the two decided to settle in Williamsburg, Brooklyn. Two weeks after his arrival, he borrowed money to buy his first Bolex 16mm camera and began recording moments of his life.

He discovered avant-garde film at venues such as Amos Vogel's pioneering Cinema 16, and he began curating avant-garde film screenings at Gallery East on Avenue A and Houston Street and at the Film Forum series at Carl Fisher Auditorium on 57th Street.

Career
In 1954, Mekas and his brother Adolfas founded the journal Film Culture, and in 1958 he began writing his "Movie Journal" column for The Village Voice. In 1962, he co-founded The Film-Makers' Cooperative, and in 1964 the Filmmakers' Cinematheque, which eventually became Anthology Film Archives, one of the world's largest and most important repositories of avant-garde film. Along with Lionel Rogosin, he was part of the New American Cinema movement. He was a close collaborator with artists such as Marie Menken, Andy Warhol, Nico, Allen Ginsberg, Yoko Ono, John Lennon, Salvador Dalí, and fellow Lithuanian George Maciunas.

Mekas gave the film Heaven and Earth Magic its title in 1964/65.

In 1964, Mekas was arrested on obscenity charges for showing Flaming Creatures (1963) and Jean Genet's Un Chant d'Amour (1950). He launched a campaign against the censorship board, and for the next few years continued to exhibit films at the Filmmakers' Cinematheque, the Jewish Museum, and the Gallery of Modern Art. From 1964 to 1967, he organized the New American Cinema Expositions, which toured Europe and South America, and in 1966 joined the 80 Wooster Fluxhouse Coop.

In 1970, Anthology Film Archives opened on 425 Lafayette Street as a film museum, screening space, and library, with Mekas as its director. Mekas, along with Stan Brakhage, Ken Kelman, Peter Kubelka, James Broughton, and P. Adams Sitney, began the ambitious Essential Cinema project at Anthology Film Archives to establish a canon of important cinematic works. Mekas's legs appeared in John Lennon and Yoko Ono's experimental film Up Your Legs Forever (1971).

As a filmmaker, Mekas' own output ranged from his early narrative film Guns of the Trees (1961) to "diary films" such as Walden (1969); Lost, Lost, Lost (1975), Reminiscences of a Journey to Lithuania (1972), Zefiro Torna (1992), and As I Was Moving Ahead Occasionally I Saw Brief Glimpses of Beauty (2000), which have been screened at festivals and museums around the world. Mekas' diary films offered a new perspective to the genre and portrayed the cinematic avant-garde scene of the 1960s.

Mekas expanded the scope of his practice with his later works of multi-monitor installations, sound immersion pieces and "frozen-film" prints. Together they offer a new experience of his classic films and a novel presentation of his more recent video work. His work has been exhibited at the 51st Venice Biennial, PS1 Contemporary Art Center, the Ludwig Museum, the Serpentine Gallery, the Jewish Museum, and the Jonas Mekas Visual Arts Center.

In 2007, Mekas released one film every day on his website, a project he entitled "The 365 Day Project." The online diary is still ongoing on Jonas Mekas' official website. It was celebrated in 2015 with a show titled "The Internet Saga" which was curated by Francesco Urbano Ragazzi at Palazzo Foscari Contarini on the occasion of the 56th Venice Biennale of Visual Arts.

Beginning in the 1970s, Mekas taught film courses at the New School for Social Research, MIT, Cooper Union, and New York University.

Additionally, Mekas was a writer and published his poems and prose in Lithuanian, French, German, and English. His work has been translated into English by the Lithuanian-American poet Vyt Bakaitis in such collections as Daybooks: 1970-1972 (Portable Press at Yo-Yo Labs, 2003) and a bilingual anthology of modern Lithuanian verse, Gyvas atodūsis/Breathing Free, poems (Lietuvos, 2001). Mekas published many of his journals and diaries, including I Had Nowhere to Go: Diaries, 1944–1954 and Letters from Nowhere, as well as articles on film criticism, theory, and technique. In 2007, the Jonas Mekas Visual Arts Center was opened in Vilnius.

One of Mekas' last exhibitions, "Notes from Downtown," took place at James Fuentes Gallery on the Lower East Side in 2018. Mekas's last work, Requiem, premiered posthumously at The Shed in New York City on November 1, 2019. The 84-minute video was commissioned by The Shed and Festspielhaus Baden-Baden. It screened in tandem with a performance of Verdi's Requiem, conducted by Teodor Currentzis and performed by the musicAeterna orchestra.

In 2018, Ina Navazelskis, an oral historian at the National Institute for Holocaust Documentation, United States Holocaust Memorial Museum interviewed Mekas for their Jeff and Toby Herr Oral History Archive. There, he discussed his memories of World War II

"Jonas Mekas: The Camera Was Always Running", the filmmaker's first retrospective in the United States, was organized by Guest Curator Kelly Taxter and on view at the Jewish Museum in the spring of 2022.

German filmmaker Peter Sempel has made three films about Mekas' works and life, Jonas in the Desert (1991), Jonas at the Ocean (2004), and Jonas in the Jungle (2013).

Personal life
Mekas married Hollis Melton in 1974. They had two children, a daughter, Oona, and a son, Sebastian. His family is featured in Jonas's films, including Out-takes from the Life of a Happy Man and As I Was Moving Ahead Occasionally I Saw Brief Glimpses of Beauty.

Mekas died at his home in Brooklyn on January 23, 2019, at the age of 96.

Mekas is the subject of a documentary, Fragments of Paradise, which premiered at the 2022 Venice Film Festival. The film received the award for Best Documentary on Cinema at the Festival.

Controversy over World War II activities
Mekas long maintained that, while working for local newspapers, he also clandestinely-transcribed BBC broadcasts in support of the underground. In 2018, an article in the New York Review of Books by historian Michael Casper challenged Mekas's versions of his wartime activities. Casper claims that Mekas participated "in an underground movement in Biržai that supported the 1941 Nazi invasion of Soviet Lithuania" and worked for "two ultranationalist and Nazi propaganda newspapers, until he fled Lithuania in 1944." Casper noted that Mekas's publications in these newspapers were not anti-Semitic. 

At the time, art critic and historian Barry Schwabsky penned a letter to the editor criticizing Casper's essay. He and Casper had an exchange of letters in the New York Review of Books.

The United States Holocaust Memorial Museum's website biography of Mekas maintains that he participated in both the anti-Soviet and anti-Nazi undergrounds.

Following the 2022 exhibition at the Jewish Museum in New York, Casper published an article entitled "World War II Revisionism at the Jewish Museum" in Jewish Currents. There, he argued that the "art world at large remains deeply invested in the story of Mekas the anti-Nazi," thus perpetuating revisionism not only erasing his roles, but casting him as an anti-Nazi hero.

In an article for the Jewish Telegraphic Agency on Casper's charges against the Jewish Museum, journalist Asaf Shalev also pointed out that a two different memos were circulated among the museum employees to dismiss Casper's article. Kelly Taxter, the guest curator of the exhibit, responded to Casper's historical research by saying that "the tone of these emails is often aggressive." This was based on emails shared by the Mekas family, which Shalev also had access to, although Shalev wrote that "Nothing on there looked to me like Casper was bullying Mekas or that Mekas get bullied."

Sovietologist Robert van Voren voiced criticisms of Casper's articles. Saulius Sužiedėlis argued, “The review format of the articles allowed Casper to present judgements without the burden of buttressing his allegations with relevant sources and requisite detail. The resulting narrative turns Jonas Mekas’s life as a young man into something that it was not.” 

The film scholars J. Hoberman and B. Ruby Rich have shown support for Casper's findings. In an article in Film Quarterly, B. Ruby Rich stated that, upon Casper's article, "The wagons started circling immediately to protect a sacred figure of the avant-garde."

In 2023, Casper discussed his research on Mekas at length in an interview with Lithuanian journalist Karolis Vyšniauskas.

Awards and honors

 Guggenheim Fellowship (1977) 
 Creative Arts Award, Brandeis University (1977)
 Mel Novikoff Award, San Francisco Film Festival (1992)
 Lithuanian National Prize, Lithuania (1995)
 Doctor of Fine Arts, Honoris Causa, Kansas City Art Institute (1996)
 Special Tribute, New York Film Critics Circle Awards (1996)
 Pier Paolo Pasolini Award, Paris (1997)
 International Documentary Film Association Award, Los Angeles (1997)
 Governors Award from the Skowhegan School of Painting and Sculpture, Maine (1997)
 Atrium Doctoris Honoris Causa, Vytautas Magnus University, Lithuania (1997)
 Represented Lithuania at the 51st International Art Exhibition Venice Biennial (2005)
 United States National Film Preservation Board selects Reminiscences of a Journey to Lithuania for preservation in the Library of Congress' National Film Registry (2006)
 Los Angeles Film Critics Association's Award (2006)
 Austrian Decoration for Science and Art (2008)
 Baltic Cultural Achievement Award for Outstanding Contributions to the field of Arts and Science (2008)
 Life Achievement Award at the second annual Rob Pruitt's Art Awards (2010)
 George Eastman Honorary Scholar Award (2011)
 'Carry your Light and Believe' Award, Ministry of Culture, Lithuania (2012)
 Commandeur de l'Ordre des Arts et Lettres, Ministry of Culture, France (2013)

Filmography
Source:
Guns of the Trees (1962)
Film Magazine of the Arts (1963)
The Brig (1964) - 65 minutes
Empire (1964)
Award Presentation to Andy Warhol (1964)
Report from Millbrook (1964–65)
Hare Krishna (1966)
Notes on the Circus (1966)
Cassis (1966)
The Italian Notebook (1967)
Time and Fortune Vietnam Newsreel (1968)
Walden (Diaries, Notes, and Sketches) (1969) - 3 hours
Reminiscences of a Journey to Lithuania (1971–72)
Lost, Lost, Lost (1976)
In Between: 1964–8 (1978)
Notes for Jerome (1978)
Paradise Not Yet Lost (also known as Oona's Third Year) (1979)
Street Songs (1966/1983)
Cups/Saucers/Dancers/Radio (1965/1983)
Erik Hawkins: Excerpts from "Here and Now with Watchers"/Lucia Dlugoszewski Performs (1983)
He Stands in a Desert Counting the Seconds of His Life (1969/1986)
Scenes from the Life of Andy Warhol (1990)
Mob of Angels/The Baptism (1991)
Dr. Carl G. Jung or Lapis Philosophorum (1991)
Quartet Number One (1991)
Mob of Angels at St. Ann (1992)
Zefiro Torna or Scenes from the Life of George Maciunas (1992)
The Education of Sebastian or Egypt Regained (1992)
He Travels. In Search of... (1994)
Imperfect 3-Image Films (1995)
On My Way to Fujiyama I Met... (1995)
Happy Birthday to John (1996) - 34 minutes
Memories of Frankenstein (1996)
Birth of a Nation (1997)
Scenes from Allen's Last Three Days on Earth as a Spirit (1997)
Letter from Nowhere – Laiskas is Niekur N.1 (1997)
Symphony of Joy (1997)
Song of Avignon (1998)
Laboratorium (1999)
Autobiography of a Man Who Carried His Memory in His Eyes (2000)
This Side of Paradise (1999) - 35 minutes
Notes on Andy's Factory (1999)
Mysteries (1966–2001)
As I Was Moving Ahead Occasionally I Saw Brief Glimpses of Beauty (2000) - 285 minutes
Remedy for Melancholy (2000)
Ein Maerchen (2001)
Williamsburg, Brooklyn (1950–2003)
Mozart & Wien and Elvis (2000)
Travel Songs (1967–1981)
Dedication to Leger (2003)
Notes on Utopia (2003) 30 min
Letter from Greenpoint (2004)
 The Definition of Insanity (film) (2004) (as Dr. Mekas)
365 Day Project (2007), 30 hours in total
Notes on American Film Director: Martin Scorsese (2007), 80 minutes.
Lithuania and the Collapse of USSR (2008), 4 hours 50 minutes.
I Leave Chelsea Hotel (2009), 4 minutes
WTC Haikus (2010)
Sleepless Nights Stories (Premiere at the Berlinale 2011) - 114 minutes
My Mars Bar Movie (2011)
 Correspondences: José Luis Guerin and Jonas Mekas (2011)
 Reminiszenzen aus Deutschland (2012)
 Out-takes from the Life of a Happy Man (2012) - 68 minutes
 Requiem (2019) - 84 minutes

References

Further reading 
 Hans-Jürgen Tast (Hrsg.) "As I Was Moving. Kunst und Leben" (Schellerten/Germany 2004) (z.m.a.K.), .
 Efren Cuevas, "The Immigrant Experience in Jonas Mekas's Diary Films: A Chronotopic Análisis of Lost, Lost, Lost", Biography, vol. 29, n. 1, winter 2006, pp. 55–73, .
 Fashion Film Festival presents "The Internet Saga", 
 Roslyn Bernstein & Shael Shapiro, Illegal Living: 80 Wooster Street and the Evolution of SoHo, www.illegalliving.com published by the Jonas Mekas Foundation.
Steven Watson, "Factory Made: Warhol and the Sixties" Pantheon Books, 2003
Michael Casper, "I Was There". New York Review of Books, June 7, 2018.

Inesa Brašiškè, Lukas Brasiskis, and Kelly Taxter, Jonas Mekas: The Camera Was Always Running. New York and New Haven: Jewish Museum and Yale University Press. 2022. 
Michael Casper, "World War II Revisionism at the Jewish Museum". Jewish Currents, April 21, 2022.
Saulius Sužiedėlis, “Portrait of a Poet as a Young Man: Jonas Mekas in War and Exile”. e-flux Journal, Issue #129, September 2022.

 Ivanov, Maksim. Jonas Mekas' Diary Films in: Lithuanian Cinema: Special Edition for Lithuanian Film Days in Poland 2015, Auksė Kancerevičiūtė [ed.]. Vilnius: Lithuanian Film Centre, 2015. .

External links 
 Jonas Mekas' website
 The Anthology Film Archives
 Jonas Mekas Visual Arts Center
 A Conversation between Jonas Mekas and Stan Brakhage
 Interview with Interview Magazine
 Interview with 3:AM Magazine
 Jonas Mekas "The Internet Saga", Venice
 Senses of Cinema: Great Directors Critical Database
 Jonas Mekas interview with Our Culture Mag
 Jonas Mekas in conversation with the Brooklyn Rail
 Jonas Mekas poetry in English
 Jonas Mekas tells his life story at Web of Stories
 "To Barbara Rubin With Love" by Jonas Mekas
 Jonas Mekas addresses his war time activities.
 Jonas Mekas at the Serpentine Gallery 2012

 
1922 births
2019 deaths
20th-century American male writers
20th-century American poets
20th-century Lithuanian writers
21st-century American male writers
21st-century Lithuanian writers
American experimental filmmakers
Chevaliers of the Ordre des Arts et des Lettres
Film directors from New York City
Fluxus
Johannes Gutenberg University Mainz alumni
Lithuanian artists
Lithuanian emigrants to the United States
Lithuanian expatriates in Austria
Lithuanian expatriates in Germany
Lithuanian experimental filmmakers
Lithuanian film directors
Lithuanian male poets
Lithuanian refugees
Lithuanian resistance members
Lithuanian writers
People from Panevėžys County
People from Williamsburg, Brooklyn
Recipients of the Austrian Decoration for Science and Art
Recipients of the Lithuanian National Prize
The Village Voice people
Writers from Brooklyn
Cinema of Lithuania